Michael T. Walczewski (born January 9, 1956) is an American public address announcer best known for his work for the New York Knicks of the National Basketball Association.

A native of Queens, Walczewski resides in Hastings-on-Hudson, New York.

Walczewski has served as the arena voice of the Knicks since 1989 (replacing the late John F.X. Condon) and the New York Liberty of the WNBA since their inception in 1997. He also voices for many college basketball games at Madison Square Garden. Furthermore, his voice talents can be heard in a television advertisement for Dr Pepper, an episode of Sex and the City, and the 1995 Billy Crystal film Forget Paris. During the 1990s, Walczewski announced many Knicks playoff games at Madison Square Garden. He saw the Knicks, led by Patrick Ewing, reach the NBA Eastern Conference Finals 4 times from 1993-2000, and was also able to see them make 2 NBA Finals appearances (1994 & 1999).  He is perhaps most well known for his in-arena calls of "PAT-RICK EWING!" (when Patrick Ewing scored a basket), "Ooooooone shot..." (when a player is taking one free throw after a made field goal on which he or she was fouled.) and "Threeeeeee point goal (player's name)" when a player makes a three pointer.

Before being the PA voice of the Knicks, Walczewski was the voice of the Fordham Rams men's basketball team—a position he took after his graduation from the university in 1979.

External links
Walczewski biography news article

Living people
New York Knicks personnel
National Basketball Association public address announcers
People from Queens, New York
1956 births
Fordham University alumni